The Bologna Children's Book Fair or La fiera del libro per ragazzi is the leading professional fair for children's books in the world. 

Since 1963, it is held yearly for four days in March or April in Bologna, Italy. It is the meeting place for all professionals involved with creating and publishing children's books, and is mainly used for the buying and selling of rights, both for translations and for derived products like movies or animated series. It is also the event where a number of major awards are given, the BolognaRagazzi Awards, in four categories (Fiction, Non-fiction, New Horizons (for the non-Western world) and Opera Prima (for first works). During the fair, but separate from it, some major awards are announced, including the biannual Hans Christian Andersen Awards and the Astrid Lindgren Memorial Award.

Since 1967, the Illustrators Exhibition within the Bologna Children's Book Fair presents the works of the illustrators selected by the jury which consists of five international experts (two publishers and three illustrators or teachers of illustration). Each year, five pieces of original artwork are submitted by around 3,000 artists from more than 70 nations.

Due to the ongoing COVID-19 pandemic the 57th fair in 2020 was first postponed, then later cancelled. To facilitate the fair's main purpose, the international sale of rights and other publishing agreements, the organisers are creating a digital platform.

On April 9, 2021, the Bologna Children's Book Fair announced the cancelation of its physical 2021 fair due to the COVID-19 pandemic.  

The next 59th edition of Bologna Children’s Book Fair will take place in Bologna from 21 to 24 March 2022.

Awards associated with the Fair
 The Hans Christian Andersen Award
 The Astrid Lindgren Memorial Award
 The Silent Book Contest - also known as the Gianni De Conno Award

See also

 Books in Italy

Notes

External links

 

Book fairs in Italy
Children's books
Culture in Bologna
Recurring events established in 1963
1963 establishments in Italy
Trade fairs in Italy